Douglas Haigh Newlands (29 October 1931 – 11 April 2011) was a Scottish professional association footballer who played as a winger.

Career
Newlands was born in Edinburgh and began his career with Aberdeen. He had a productive loan spell with St Johnstone which prompted top-flight English club Burnley to sign Newlands in 1954. He had to bide his time to force himself into the starting eleven at Turf Moor with Billy Gray occupying the number 7. He became a regular in 1956–57 and 1957–58 before the emergence of John Connelly signalled the end of Newlands' time at Burnley. He joined Stoke City and made an instant impact scoring on his debut against Sunderland. It was to be just a one-season stay at Stoke for Newlands and after the end of the 1959–60 season he returned to St Johnstone. He later played for Airdrieonians and Forfar Athletic.

Career statistics
Source:

References

External links
 

1931 births
2011 deaths
Footballers from Edinburgh
Scottish footballers
Association football midfielders
Aberdeen F.C. players
St Johnstone F.C. players
Burnley F.C. players
Stoke City F.C. players
Airdrieonians F.C. (1878) players
Forfar Athletic F.C. players
Scottish Football League players
English Football League players
Scottish football managers
Forfar Athletic F.C. managers
Scottish Football League managers